Charlestown High School is a public school located at 240 Medford Street in Charlestown, Boston, Massachusetts, United States. Charlestown High School is the only high school in Charlestown.  Charlestown is part of the Boston Public Schools.  According to the article, "Focus On Children, the Boston Publics Schools School Report Card," of the students enrolled in 2003-2004, 70.6% were in regular education 7.1% in bilingual education, and 22.2% in the special education. The racial/ethnic composition of the student population in the school was: 46.3% Black, 26.4% Hispanic, 19.5% Asian, and 7.6% White.

Academic organization 
The school consists of grades nine through twelve. The school provides a strong academic program due to the five small learning communities/pathways. These communities and pathways are within an upper school and lower school. They were created in 1998 and 1999. The five small learning communities have a college-based curriculum with a signature theme. These signature themes range from web design, law & justice, and pre-engineering, to business/technology and MCAS preparation/academics. There are ten teachers and one leader in each small learning communities. Each teacher has one specific theme to teach.

Curriculum 
The Charlestown High School curriculum is strongly based on preparing students for a college education.  In addition to the basic curriculum, extensive attention is given to college and exploration.  Most of the students participate in the Boston University COACH (College Orientation and Career Help) program. Each Friday two groups of Boston University students come to the school where they divide up by teams and go to the pathways classes, for both juniors and seniors.  They work with the students on the entire college application process and portray what college life is like to the students.  Since the Boston University (and Harvard at one point) COACH program has been at the Charlestown High School, college application and admission has risen 28%.  Because of this rise in college applicants at Charlestown High, over 70 percent of the recent graduates have gone to college.

Charlestown High School is also known for its vibrant visual arts program. Recognized in a 2005 Fund for Teachers award, student artwork adorns many school and municipal facilities.  Other electives include a popular forensics class and Air Force Junior Reserve Officer Training Corps.

In addition, the school provides extensive support services through college and business partnerships, such Harvard, Bunker Hill, Liberty Mutual and more. Student volunteers from the Harvard College chapter of Peer Health Exchange also visit the high school to teach sexual and health education classes.

Busing and desegregation 
Charlestown High School received considerable national attention in the 1975-1976 school
year when court-mandated forced busing brought African-American children to what was at that time a predominantly white high school in an Irish neighborhood of Boston.  Forced busing initially brought great discord and resulted in fights and arrests.  There were also enduring images such as the famous photograph of a black and a white student holding hands out the window of their school bus (see the NPR article in the external links below).

Contributing to the discord was the infamous September 28, 1979 school shooting of Darryl K. Williams, an African-American football player for Jamaica Plain High School, at Charlestown High School during a football game.  Three Irish Americans, at least one of whom had dropped out of Charlestown High School, shot Williams at halftime on the field from a building rooftop while his team was huddled for a pep talk. (See List of school shootings in the United States).  Williams was permanently paralyzed below the neck.  The shooting was initially considered racially motivated, and a race riot was barely averted.  However, a large rally in support of the shooting victim was held at City Hall Plaza in Boston for Williams.  Also, for security reasons Charlestown High School did not play home football games for nine years.

Sports success 

The Charletown High school boys basketball team is in the Boston City League.  The Basketball team won the State Championship for four straight years, in 1999-2003. The team won the Division 2 State Championshion again in 2005.  In  the 2004-2005 season the team record was 26 and 1.  For all these years, the head coach was Jack O'Brien and his assistant coaches were Zach Zegarowski, Steve Cassidy  and Hugh Coleman. University of Connecticut and NBA Orlando Magic guard Shabazz Napier is a former player of the Charlestown basketball team, and his jersey was retired by the high school in January 2014.

Notable alumni
 Mary Edna Hill Gray Dow (1848-1914), financier and journalist
 Bob Giggie (1959-1962), major league baseball pitcher from 1959-1962.  
 Tony Lee (born 1986), basketball player who played professionally in Poland and Austria
 Shabazz Napier (born 1991), basketball player who played in the NBA from 2014-2020. 
 Florence Cushman (1860-1940), astronomer at the Harvard College Observatory who worked on the Henry Draper Catalogue.

References

External links 
 Charlestown High School Homepage
 BostonPublicSchools.org page
 Charlestown High School Basketball Team
 NPR: The Legacy of School Busing: 4/28/04

High schools in Boston
Educational institutions established in 1845
Public high schools in Massachusetts
1845 establishments in Massachusetts